The United States Alien Terrorist Removal Court is a special court in the United States created in 1996 that has never conducted proceedings. It consists of five Article III judges, selected by the Chief Justice of the United States. Its job is to determine whether aliens (non-citizens) should be deported from the United States on the grounds that they are terrorists.

The court has never received an application from the Attorney General for the removal of an alien terrorist, and has therefore conducted no proceedings.

Current composition of the court 
As of 2023:

Former judges 
As of 2023:

See also
Special Immigration Appeals Commission

Notes

References
 

United States federal courts
United States immigration law
Deportation from the United States
Terrorism in the United States
1996 establishments in the United States
Courts and tribunals established in 1996